Gulpener Bierbrouwerij BV is an independent Dutch brewery in Gulpen, Netherlands. The brewery was founded in 1825 by Laurens Smeets.

Gulpener makes a lager sold in the Netherlands. Ingredients, such as barley and hops, are sourced from local farmers. These farmers produce their products in ecologically friendly ways.

Beers

The company makes the following beers:
Gulpener Pilsner
Gulpener Korenwolf
Gulpener Dort
Gulpener Oud Bruin
Gulpener Lentebock
Gulpener Herfstbock
Gulpener Gladiator
Gulpener Rosé 
Sjoes
Château Neubourg
Gerardus Wittems Kloosterbier Dubbel
Gerardus Wittems Kloosterbier Blond
Limburgs Land Eko Pilsner
Mestreechs Aajt
Gulpener Wintervrund
Rowwen Hèze Bier
 Organic certified:
 Ur-Pilsner (Pilsner)
 Ur-Weizen (Weizen)
 Ur-Hop (India pale lager)
Zwarte Ruiter zuur bier

References

External links

   

1820s establishments in the Netherlands
Companies established in 1825
Breweries in Limburg (Netherlands)
South Limburg (Netherlands)
Buildings and structures in Gulpen-Wittem
Food and drink companies established in 1825